Wong Kei-kwan (born 1955), better known by his pen name Zunzi, is a political cartoonist living in Hong Kong. Zunzi has been called "the territory's most prominent political cartoonist"; he has depicted Jiang Zemin, Liu Xiaobo and Xi Jinping. Zunzi has held international exhibitions in places like Toronto and Vancouver. The Zunzi page at the Hong Kong Art Archive contains 16 works.

Biography
Zunzi studied Fine Arts in the Chinese University of Hong Kong. He started to publish cartoons in newspapers and magazines in the late 1970s. Zunzi has been working since 1980 for the Ming Pao Daily News, where he was given a daily column for his satirical political cartoons. He has worked as a staff writer. Prior to 2002, his works were published mainly in the Ming Pao Daily, Apple Daily and Next Magazine. Zunzi has chronicled Hong Kong affairs for over 40 years from his drawing board.

See also
Society-related comics

References

Chinese editorial cartoonists
Hong Kong democracy activists
Hong Kong newspaper people
Hong Kong artists
Hong Kong writers
1955 births
Living people
Place of birth missing (living people)